The 182nd Ohio Infantry Regiment, sometimes 182nd Ohio Volunteer Infantry (or 182nd OVI) was an infantry regiment in the Union Army during the American Civil War.

Service
The 182nd Ohio Infantry was organized at Camp Chase in Columbus, Ohio August 4 through October 13, 1864, and mustered in for one year service on October 27, 1864, under the command of Colonel Lewis Butler.  Five companies were first organized at Camp Toledo in Toledo, Ohio, before being sent to Camp Chase to complete organization of the regiment.

The regiment was attached to Post and Defenses of Nashville, Tennessee, Department of the Cumberland, to December 1864. 2nd Brigade, 4th Division, XX Corps, Department of the Cumberland, to March 1865. Garrison at Nashville, Tennessee, Department of the Cumberland, to July 1865.

The 182nd Ohio Infantry mustered out of service July 7, 1865, at Nashville, Tennessee, and was discharged at Camp Chase on July 13, 1865.

Detailed service
This regiment was organized in the state at large from Aug. 4 to Oct. 27, 1864, to serve for one year. On Nov. 1 it was ordered to Nashville Tenn., and on the 6th joined Gen. Thomas' forces at that place. The regiment took part in the Battle of Nashville, where it remained performing guard and provost duty until July 7, 1865, when it was mustered out in accordance with orders from the war department.

Casualties
The regiment lost a total of 61 enlisted men during service, all due to disease.

Commanders
 Colonel Lewis Butler
 Lieutenant Colonel John A. Chase

See also

 List of Ohio Civil War units
 Ohio in the Civil War

References
 Dyer, Frederick H. A Compendium of the War of the Rebellion (Des Moines, IA:  Dyer Pub. Co.), 1908.
 Hopkins, Owen Johnston. Under the Flag of the Nation: Diaries and Letters of a Yankee Volunteer in the Civil War (Columbus, OH:  Ohio State University Press), 1961. [reprinted in 1998]
 Ohio Roster Commission. Official Roster of the Soldiers of the State of Ohio in the War on the Rebellion, 1861–1865, Compiled Under the Direction of the Roster Commission (Akron, OH: Werner Co.), 1886–1895.
 Reid, Whitelaw. Ohio in the War: Her Statesmen, Her Generals, and Soldiers (Cincinnati, OH: Moore, Wilstach, & Baldwin), 1868.

References

External links
 Ohio in the Civil War: 182nd Ohio Volunteer Infantry by Larry Stevens
 National flag of the 182nd Ohio Infantry
 Regimental flag of the 182nd Ohio Infantry

Military units and formations established in 1864
Military units and formations disestablished in 1865
Units and formations of the Union Army from Ohio
1864 establishments in Ohio